Bickerton is a village on the B1224 road, in the civil parish of Bilton-in-Ainsty with Bickerton, in the Harrogate district, in the English county of North Yorkshire. The nearest town is Wetherby. There is a plantation nearby called Bickerton Plantation.

History 
Bickerton is mentioned in the Domesday Book as belonging to Gospatric and having four villagers. The name of the village derives from the Old English of bīcere and tūn; the town of the bee-keepers. Historically, the village was in the wapentake of Ainsty, in what was the West Riding of Yorkshire. The road to the immediate south of the village was part of the Bickerton and Rufforth Turnpike trust, and in the 1820s, Bickerton was a stop on the coaching route between Leeds and York. The modern day designation of the road is the B1224, which runs between York and Wetherby.

Location grid

References

External links 
Bilton-in-Ainsty with Bickerton parish website

Villages in North Yorkshire
Borough of Harrogate